Juan Esteban Ferrero, O. Cist. or Giovanni Stefano Ferrero (1568–1610) was a Roman Catholic prelate who served as Bishop of Vercelli (1599–1610) and Apostolic Nuncio to Emperor (1604–1607).

Biography
Juan Esteban Ferrero was born in Biella, Italy on 3 November 1568 and ordained a priest in the Cistercian Order.
On 29 March 1599, he was appointed during the papacy of Pope Clement VIII as Bishop of Vercelli.
On 1 May 1599, he was consecrated bishop by Federico Borromeo (seniore), Archbishop of Milan, with Fabio Biondi, Titular Patriarch of Jerusalem, and Carlo Conti, Bishop of Ancona e Numana, serving as co-consecrators. 
On 20 January 1604, he was appointed during the papacy of Pope Clement VIII as Apostolic Nuncio to Emperor; he resigned on 3 May 1607.
He served as Bishop of Vercelli until his death on 21 September 1610.

Episcopal succession

References

External links and additional sources
 (for Chronology of Bishops) 
 (for Chronology of Bishops) 
 (for Chronology of Bishops) 

16th-century Italian Roman Catholic bishops
17th-century Italian Roman Catholic bishops
Bishops appointed by Pope Clement VIII
1568 births
1610 deaths
Cistercian bishops
Apostolic Nuncios to the Holy Roman Empire